The Swiss Women's Cup  is a women's football cup tournament that has been organised annually since 1975 by the Swiss Football Association (SFV-ASF).

Finals
All final matches are:

Titles by club

References

External links
football.ch; Swiss Cup
women.soccerway.com; Swiss Cup

Switzerland
Cup
Recurring sporting events established in 1975
1975 establishments in Switzerland
Women